The 100 metres at the 2007 World Championships in Athletics was held at the Nagai Stadium on August 25 and August 26.

Medalists

Records

Results

Heats
Qualification: First 3 in each heat (Q) and the next 8 fastest (q) advance to the quarterfinals.

Heat 1

Heat 2

Heat 3

Heat 4

Heat 5

Heat 6

Heat 7

Heat 8

Quarterfinals
First 4 of each Heat directly qualified (Q) for the Semifinals.

Heat 1

Heat 2

Heat 3

Heat 4

Semifinals
First 4 of each Heat directly qualified (Q) for the Final.

Heat 1

Heat 2

Final

References

100 meters
100 metres at the World Athletics Championships